Heather Watson was the defending champion, but lost in the quarterfinals to Angelique Kerber.

Anastasia Pavlyuchenkova won her fourth title here and for the second time, beating Kerber in the final, with Kerber at the position of World No. 1, in three sets.

Seeds

Draw

Finals

Top half

Bottom half

Qualifying

Seeds

Qualifiers

Draw

First qualifier

Second qualifier

Third qualifier

Fourth qualifier

References
Main Draw
Qualifying Draw

Monterrey Open - Singles
2017 Singles